Le Travailleur du Loiret ('The Worker of Loiret') was a communist weekly newspaper published from Orléans, France, founded in 1924. In 1935 it had a circulation of 2,700, by 1937 the circulation had reached 3,600.

References

1924 establishments in France
Communist newspapers
History of the French Communist Party
Mass media in Orléans
Defunct newspapers published in France
Newspapers established in 1924